Karobo Moses Motsisi (1932–1977), better known as Casey Motsisi or Casey "Kid" Motsisi, was a South African short story writer and journalist

Biography
Motsisi was born in Johannesburg and worked for a time in Pretoria as a teacher.

He was a reporter for Drum magazine until 1962 and then left to work for The World, returning to Drum in 1974. He wrote the regular "Bugs" column, which was humorous and satirical, featuring discussions and conversations between two bed bugs. He also wrote the "On the Beat" column.

Motsisi's style borrowed heavily from that of Damon Runyon, using "Americanese" and Tsotsitaal (local township slang). The stories he wrote were based on his extensive knowledge of the Sophiatown shebeen culture, depicting a variety of township types, such as Aunt Peggy, the shebeen queen, and a variety of rogues including Kid Playboy and Kid Hangover.

Motsisi also contributed to The Classic, a journal edited by a fellow Drum journalist Nat Nakasa.

The Drum Decade  contains a number of articles by Motsisi, including:

 "If Bugs Were Men"
 "Johburg Jailbugs"
 "On the Beat" [Kid Hangover]
 "On the Beat" [Kid Playboy]
 "On the Beat" [Kid Newspapers]

Books

 Casey & Co: Selected Writings of Casey "Kid" Motsisi, edited by Mothobi Mutloatse, Ravan Press, 1978, 
Riot :writings of Casey "Kid" Motsisi

See also

 List of South African writers
 Mike Nicol, Good-Looking Corpse: World of Drum - Jazz and Gangsters, Hope and Defiance in the Townships of South Africa'', London: Secker & Warburg, 1991.

References

1932 births
1977 deaths
South African journalists
South African male short story writers
South African short story writers
People from Johannesburg
20th-century journalists